Crumb Borne is a 1965 novel written by Clive Barry. It won the Guardian Fiction Prize in the year of its inception.

References

Novels set during World War II
1965 Australian novels